Anne Taormina is a Belgian mathematical physicist whose research topics include string theory, conformal field theory, and monstrous moonshine. Beyond mathematical physics, she has also studied the icosahedral symmetry of virus capsids. She is Professor of Theoretical Particle Physics in the Department of Mathematical Sciences at Durham University.

Early life and education
Taormina is originally from Mons in Belgium; her parents were schoolteachers, and she has two sisters, one who became a physician and another who became a translator. She earned a license in mathematical sciences in 1980 from the University of Mons, and completed her doctorate in theoretical particle physics at the same university in 1984 under the supervision of Jean Nuyts.

Career
After short-term research positions with the Belgian National Fund for Scientific Research, the laboratory for theoretical physics at the École normale supérieure (Paris) (supported by the French National Centre for Scientific Research), CERN in Geneva, and the University of Chicago, she came to Durham in 1991 as a Science and Engineering Research Council Advanced Fellow. She remained at Durham as a temporary lecturer for 1996–1997, and as a Leverhulme Postdoc from 1997 to 2000, until becoming a lecturer in 2000. She was promoted to reader in 2004 and professor in 2006.

Taormina headed the Durham Department of Mathematical Sciences for five years, from 2014 to 2018, and is a member of the council of the London Mathematical Society.

Personal life
Taormina is married to British physicist Nigel Glover, also a professor at Durham.

References

External links
Home page

Year of birth missing (living people)
Living people
Belgian mathematicians
Belgian women mathematicians
British mathematicians
British women mathematicians
Mathematical physicists
Academics of Durham University
People associated with CERN